Damaji, also  known as Damaji Pant (Damajipant - Pant indicates ministership or high scholarship), Sant Damaji and Bhakta Damaji, was a 15th-century Marathi saint (sant) or bhakta ("devotee"), venerated by the Varkari sect of Hinduism. He was the Kamavisdar (main revenue official) of Mangalvedha under the Bahamani king of Bidar. He is described as a devotee of the god Vithoba - the patron deity of the Varkari sect. He distributed grain from the royal granaries to the people in famine. Vithoba is said to have come as an outcaste with a bag of gold to pay for the grain and rescue Damaji. The famine of 1460 is known as Damaji Pant's famine in the Deccan region in honour of Damaji's generosity in the famine.

Life

Damaji's chief hagiographical account is found in the Bhaktavijaya by Mahipati (1715 - 1790). Damaji was the revenue official of the Muslim king (sultan/ badshah) of Bidar (see Bahmani Sultanate). He is described as "generous, wise and brave". He lived in Mangalvedhe, near Pandharpur – where the chief temple of Vithoba stands. He was in charge of the revenue of the district and the keeper of the royal grain storehouses. A great famine struck the region. A Brahmin (the priest caste) from Pandharpur comes begging for food at Damaji's house. Damaji Pant Deshpande invites him home and serves him dinner. The Brahmin breaks down seeing the food and talks about the suffering of his starving family, which he left behind at Pandharpur. Damaji promises to send food for the family too.

Damaji's servants bring two loads of grain to the Brahmin's family in Pandharpur, however the people of the famine-hit town pounce on the grains and loot them. A delegation of other Brahmins from Pandharpur approach Damaji and beseech him to solve their problem of hunger. Damaji thinks that if he distributes the royal grain, numerous people will saved from starvation, however the sultan will kill him. Damaji decides to sacrifice his life to save the lives of the people. He opens the two royal grain storehouses to the famished people. Damaji granted the grain disregarding the differences of caste or class.

An "evil" Brahmin muzumdar (deputy revenue collector) shot off a letter to the sultan in Bidar informing him of the plunder of the royal grain. The sultan was enraged how Damaji distributed the grain without his permission. He sent soldiers to recover money for the grain from Damaji or bring Damaji to Bidar for decapitation if he failed to pay. Receiving the royal summons, Damaji leaves for Bidar to visit the sultan, but requests the soldiers for a halt in Pandharpur. He visits Vithoba's temple and worships the god. He says to Vithoba that he has wronged the sultan, but he is ready to face the consequences of his noble deed, and his life was complete by worshipping Vithoba.

Vithoba disguises him as a Mahar (outcaste) and reaches the sultan's court in Bidar. Vithoba introduces himself as a child who was brought up in Damaji's house and works as his servant. He presents the minister a letter in Damaji's handwriting. The letter reads how Damaji sold the grain for high prices when food had become scarce in the famine, thus increases the sultan's earnings. Further, it said that he had sent his servant with the money and the accounts. Vithoba presents the king with a small bag of gold, but when opened, the "countless" coins flow out of it. The sultan is pleased and accepts the money. He gives Vitoba a receipt of the money received and sends many gifts to Damaji with Vithoba.

The next day, Damaji arrives at the royal court. The sultan embraces him and tells about his Mahar messenger. Damaji realizes that Vithoba rescued him assuming the form of a Mahar and sings a panegyric in honour of the god. The sultan is astonished and praises Damaji, due to whom, the sultan met God. Damaji asks permission to leave the sultan's service, the sultan consents saying that God was now Damaji's debtor. Damaji settles in Pandharpur with his family and serves the god and sings kirtans in his honour.

Dating and historicity
While some scholars had dismissed Damaji as a legendary figure earlier, a discovery of an undated mahajar (testimonial of right) document is interpreted by historian V.K. Rajwade to be historical evidence for Damaji. The first part of the document states which kind of animal should be ridden by a bridegroom of a particular caste in his marriage procession. The second part deals with what a Mahar should get from different castes. The document mentions: "By order of the Badshah (king of Bidar) and his seal and in the handwriting of Damaji Pant".

The famine of 1460 is called "Damaji Pant's famine" in the Deccan region, as it is believed to the famine when Damaji distributed the grain. The famine was a result of failure of the monsoon and widespread across Western India. Others relate Damaji to the Durga Devi famine (1396–1408)  or the famine from 1468 to 1475.

Remembrance
Apart from being formally included in the list of Sants (saints) in the Bhaktavijaya, the abhangas of Eknath and Tukaram accord him sainthood and mention him with other saints. Eknath's abhanga praises Vithoba who came a Mahar to rescue Damaji.

Besides naming the 1460 famine on him, his contributions were also alluded to in the Great Famine of 1876–78. Mr. Grant, the collector of Solapur, was called Damaji Pant for his efforts to remedy the famine.

A temple in his honour stands in his home town at Mangalvedha.

References

Warkari
Medieval Hindu religious leaders
Marathi Hindu saints